The 2016 Northeastern State RiverHawks football team represented Northeastern State University in the 2016 NCAA Division II football season. The RiverHawks played their home games on Gable Field in Doc Wadley Stadium in Tahlequah, Oklahoma, as they have done since 1915. 2016 was the 102nd season in school history. The RiverHawks were led by third-year head coach, Rob Robinson. Northeastern State has been a member of the Mid-America Intercollegiate Athletics Association since 2012.

Preseason
The RiverHawks entered the 2016 season after finishing 3–8 both overall and in conference play in 2015. On August 2, 2016 at the MIAA Football Media Day, the RiverHawks were chosen to finish in 9th place in the Coaches Poll, and 10th in the Media Poll.

Personnel

Coaching staff
Along with Robinson, there are 10 assistants.

Roster

Schedule

Game summaries

Washburn

Lindenwood

Pittsburg State

Fort Hays State

Missouri Western

Emporia State

Northeastern State

Nebraska–Kearney

Missouri Southern

Central Missouri

Central Oklahoma

References

Northeastern State
Northeastern State RiverHawks football seasons
Northeastern State RiverHawks football